An orc (sometimes spelled ork; , adjective: orkish, orcish), in general, is a hideous creature such as an ogre, a sea monster, or a giant in literature. An orc, in J. R. R. Tolkien's Middle Earth fantasy fiction, is a race of humanoid monsters, which he also refers to as "goblin"-kind.

The orcs appear (especially in The Lord of the Rings) as a brutish, aggressive, ugly, and malevolent race of monsters, contrasting with the benevolent Elves. They are a corrupted race of elves, either bred that way by Morgoth, or turned savage in that manner, according to the Silmarillion.

, "demon-corpses") was a race of corrupted beings and descendants of Cain, alongside the elf, according to the poem Beowulf. Tolkien adopted the term orc from these old attestations, which he professed was a choice made purely for "phonetic suitability" reasons.

The use of the term orc in the sense of "sea monster" or "devouring monster, ogre" already occurred in Early Modern English (ca. late 16th cent.), according to the Oxford English Dictionary presumably consulted by Tolkien. The orc "sea monster" derived from orca, was unconnected to Tolkien's orc, but the other orc monster had the same Old English origins as Tolkien's orc, but also influenced by ogre of Northern European folk tales and fairy tales.

Tolkien's concept of orcs has been adapted into the fantasy fiction of other authors, and into games of many different genres such as Dungeons & Dragons, Magic: The Gathering, and Warcraft.

Etymology

Old English 

The word orc probably derives from the Latin word/name .

The term  is glossed as "" ("Goblin, spectre, or hell-devil") in the 10th century Old English Cleopatra Glossaries, about which Thomas Wright wrote, "Orcus was the name for Pluto, the god of the infernal regions, hence we can easily understand the explanation of hel-deofol. Orc, in Anglo-Saxon, like thyrs, means a spectre, or goblin."

The term is used just once in Beowulf (in the sense of a monstrous being), as the plural compound orcneas, one of the tribes belonging to the descendants of Cain, alongside the elves and ettins (giants) condemned by God:

 is translated "evil spirits" above, but its meaning is uncertain. Frederick Klaeber suggested it consisted of orc < L. orcus  "the underworld" + neas "corpses", to which the translation "evil spirits" failed to do justice. It is generally supposed to contain an element -né, cognate to Gothic naus and Old Norse nár, both meaning 'corpse'. If *orcné is to be glossed as orcus 'corpse', then the compound word can be construed as "demon-corpses", or "corpse from Orcus (i.e. the underworld)". Hence orc-neas may have possibly been some sort of walking dead monster, a product of ancient necromancy, or even be flat out called zombies, to use a familiar modern term from popular culture.

Modern English 
In the modern sense more generally in literature, an orc denotes some horrid-faced or shaped monster, including an ogre, a sea monster, or a giant.

The word "orc" or "ork" (var. "orque", "orke") came into usage in the Early Modern English language, in the late 16th century according to the Oxford English Dictionary (OED). Tolkien, who was a contributor to the OED had certainly studied this entry.

This "orc, ork" in the first sense, referring vaguely to some sea monster (not necessarily killer whale) was a word that Tolkien himself supposed was not related to his orc, as stated in his letter (see quote under §Stated etymology). The sea monster orca in Orlando Furioso, is sometimes rendered as "orc" in modern English, and as "orke" in the early translation (cf. [[#Orlando's orca|§ Orlando'''s orca]]).

The word in the second sense of "devouring monster, ogre" is related to Old English orc, invoked by Tolkien. The word is also etymologically "derived or influenced by L. orcus and  Romanic orco [meaning 'ogre']".

One early usage is from Samuel Holland's 1656 work Don Zara del Fogo quoted as: "Who at one stroke didst pare away three heads from off the shoulders of an Orke, begotten by an Incubus".

The term "orc" has later attestations, for example, it appears on lists of imaginary creatures in two of Charles Kingsley's mid-1860s novels.

The term "orc" as monster was kept current in popular culture owing to Tolkien (and Disney), and kept from becoming obsolete like the third sense of the word, according to philologist Roberta Frank.

== Orlando's orca ==
The sea monster orca ("orke", "orc") in Orlando Furioso, which received the chained Angelica as sacrifice in the fashion of Andromeda has been given as example of "orc" in literature. The creature (described in Cantos VIII, X) is battled by Ruggiero, a native character introduced into the Italian Charlemagne cycle.

There is also the orco, and ogre or giant ("ork, orke", "orko" etc.), occurring in a later portion of Orlando Furioso (Canto XVII).

 Tolkien 

The term "orc" is used only once in the first edition of The Hobbit (1937) and are usually called "goblins" elsewhere in that book; but "orc" was later used ubiquitously in The Lord of the Rings.  

The "orc-" element occurs the sword name Orcrist, which is given as its Elvish language name, and it is glossed as "Goblin-cleaver, but the goblins called it simply Biter".

 Stated etymology 

Tolkien began the more modern use of the English term "orc" to denote a race of evil, humanoid creatures. His earliest Elvish dictionaries include the entry Ork (orq-) "monster", "ogre", "demon", together with orqindi and "ogresse". He sometimes used the plural form orqui in his early texts. He stated that the Elvish words for orc were derived from a root ruku, "fear, horror"; in Quenya, orco, plural orkor; in Sindarin orch, plurals yrch and Orchoth (as a class). They had similar names in other Middle-earth languages: uruk in Black Speech; in the language of the Drúedain gorgûn, "ork-folk"; in Khuzdul rukhs, plural rakhâs; and in the language of Rohan and in the Common Speech, orka.

Tolkien stated in a letter to the novelist Naomi Mitchison that his orcs had been influenced by George MacDonald's The Princess and the Goblin. 
He explained that his "orc" was "derived from Old English orc 'demon', but only because of its phonetic suitability", and

Tolkien also observed a similarity with the Latin word orcus, noting that "the word used in translation of Q[uenya] urko, S[indarin] orch is Orc. But that is because of the similarity of the ancient English word orc, 'evil spirit or bogey', to the Elvish words. There is possibly no connection between them."

 Description 

Orcs are of human shape, and of varying size. They are depicted as ugly and filthy, with a taste for human flesh. They are fanged, bow-legged and long-armed. Most are small and avoid daylight.

By the Third Age, a new breed of orc had emerged, the Uruk-hai, larger and more powerful, and no longer afraid of daylight. Orcs eat meat, including the flesh of Men, and may indulge in cannibalism: in The Two Towers, Grishnákh, an orc from Mordor, claims that the Isengard orcs eat orc-flesh. Whether that is true or spoken in malice is uncertain: an orc flings Peregrin Took stale bread and a "strip of raw dried flesh... the flesh of he dared not guess what creature".

Half-orcs appear in The Lord of the Rings, created by interbreeding of orcs and Men; they were able to go in sunlight. The "sly Southerner" in The Fellowship of the Ring looks "more than half like a goblin"; similar but more orc-like hybrids appear in The Two Towers "man-high, but with goblin-faces, sallow, leering, squint-eyed."

In Peter Jackson's Lord of the Rings films, the actors playing orcs are made up with masks designed to make them look evil. After a disagreement with the "notorious" Hollywood producer Harvey Weinstein, Jackson had one of the masks made to resemble Weinstein, as an insult to him.

Orkish language
The Orcs had no language of their own, merely a pidgin of many various languages. However, individual tribes developed dialects that differed so widely that Westron, often with a crude accent, was used as a common language.  A few words of the Black Speech are common among Orcs: ghâsh ("fire"), sharkû ("old man", leading to Saruman's nickname "Sharkey"), snaga ("slave"), and Uruk ("orc"). Another Orkish word is tark ("Man of Gondor") from Westron and ultimately Quenya tarkil.

When Sauron returned to power in Mordor in the Third Age, Black Speech was used by the captains of his armies and by his servants in Barad-dûr.  A substantial sample of debased Black Speech/Orkish can be found in The Two Towers, where a "yellow-fanged" guard Orc of Mordor curses Uglúk of Isengard:Uglúk u bagronk sha pushdug Saruman-glob búbhosh skai!In The Peoples of Middle-earth, Tolkien gives the translation: "Uglúk to the cesspool, sha! the dungfilth; the great Saruman-fool, skai!". However, in a note published in Vinyar Tengwar he gives an alternative translation: "Uglúk to the dung-pit with stinking Saruman-filth, pig-guts, gah!"

Alexandre Nemirovsky speculates that Tolkien may have drawn upon the language of the ancient Hittites and Hurrians for Black Speech and Orkish.

 In-fiction origins

The origin(s) of orcs were explained inconsistently in two different ways by Tolkien: the orcs were either East Elves (Avari) enslaved, tortured, and bred by Morgoth (as Melkor became known), or, "perhaps.. Avari [(a race of elves)].. [turned] evil and savage in the wild", both according to The Silmarillion.

The orcs "multiplied" like Elves and Men, i.e., reproduced sexually (with a mate). Tolkien stated in a letter dated 21 October 1963 to a Mrs. Munsby that "there must have been orc-women". In The Fall of Gondolin Morgoth made them of slime by sorcery, "bred from the heats and slimes of the earth". Or, they were "beasts of humanized shape", possibly, Tolkien wrote, Elves mated with beasts, and later Men. Or again, Tolkien noted, they could have been fallen Maiar, perhaps a kind called Boldog, like lesser Balrogs; or corrupted Men.

Shippey writes that the orcs in The Lord of the Rings were almost certainly created just to equip Middle-earth with "a continual supply of enemies over whom one need feel no compunction", or in Tolkien's words from The Monsters and the Critics "the infantry of the old war" ready to be slaughtered. Shippey states that all the same, orcs share the human concept of good and evil, with a familiar sense of morality, though he notes that, like many people, orcs are quite unable to apply their morals to themselves. In his view, Tolkien, as a Catholic, took it as a given that "evil cannot make, only mock", so orcs could not have an equal and opposite morality to that of men or elves.
In a 1954 letter, Tolkien wrote that orcs were "fundamentally a race of 'rational incarnate' creatures, though horribly corrupted, if no more so than many Men to be met today." Robert T. Tally wrote in Mythlore that despite the uniform presentation of orcs as "loathsome, ugly, cruel, feared, and especially terminable", "Tolkien could not resist the urge to flesh out and 'humanize' these inhuman creatures from time to time", in the process giving them their own morality. 
Shippey notes that in The Two Towers, the orc Gorbag disapproves of the "regular elvish trick"–an immoral act–of seeming to abandon a comrade, as he wrongly supposes Sam Gamgee has done with Frodo Baggins. Shippey describes the implied view of evil as Boethian, that evil is the absence of good. He notes, however, that Tolkien did not agree with that point of view; Tolkien believed that evil had to be actively fought, with war if necessary, something that Shippey describes as representing the Manichean position, that evil coexists with good and is at least equally powerful.

 Debated racism 

The possibility of racism in Tolkien's descriptions of orcs has been debated. In a private letter, Tolkien describes orcs as:

O'Hehir describes orcs as "a subhuman race bred by Morgoth and/or Sauron (although not created by them) that is morally irredeemable and deserves only death. They are dark-skinned and slant-eyed, and although they possess reason, speech, social organization and, as Shippey mentions, a sort of moral sensibility, they are inherently evil." He notes Tolkien's own description of them (quoted above), saying it could scarcely be more revealing as a representation of the "Other", and states "it is also the product of his background and era, like most of our inescapable prejudices. At the level of conscious intention, he was not a racist or an anti-Semite" and mentions Tolkien's letters to this effect. The literary critic Jenny Turner, writing in the London Review of Books, endorses Andrew O'Hehir's comment on Salon.com that orcs are "by design and intention a northern European's paranoid caricature of the races he has dimly heard about".

The scholar of English literature Robert Tally describes the orcs as a demonized enemy, despite (he writes) Tolkien's own objections to demonization of the enemy in the two World Wars. In a letter to his son, Christopher, who was serving in the RAF in the Second World War, Tolkien wrote of orcs as appearing on both sides of the conflict:

John Magoun, writing in the J.R.R. Tolkien Encyclopedia, states that Middle-earth has a "fully expressed moral geography". Any moral bias towards a north-western geography, however, was directly denied by Tolkien in a letter to Charlotte and Denis Plimmer, who had recently interviewed him in 1967:

Scholars of English literature William N. Rogers II and Michael R. Underwood note that a widespread element of late 19th century Western culture was fear of moral decline and degeneration; this led to eugenics. In The Two Towers, the Ent Treebeard says:

The Germanic studies scholar Sandra Ballif Straubhaar however argues against the "recurring accusations" of racism, stating that "a polycultured, polylingual world is absolutely central" to Middle-earth, and that readers and filmgoers will easily see that. The historian and Tolkien scholar Jared Lobdell likewise disagreed with any notions of racism inherent or latent in Tolkien's works, and wondered "if there were a way of writing epic fantasy about a battle against an evil spirit and his monstrous servants without its being subject to speculation of racist intent".

The journalist David Ibata writes that the interpretations of orcs in Peter Jackson's Lord of the Rings films look much like "the worst depictions of the Japanese drawn by American and British illustrators during World War II."

 Other fiction 

As a response to the type-casting of orcs as generic evil characters or antagonists, some novels portray events from the point of view of the orcs, or make them more sympathetic characters. Mary Gentle's 1992 novel Grunts! presents orcs as generic infantry, used as metaphorical cannon-fodder. A series of books by Stan Nicholls, Orcs: First Blood, focuses on the conflicts between orcs and humans from the orcs' point of view. In Terry Pratchett's Discworld series, orcs are close to extinction; in his Unseen Academicals it is said that "When the Evil Emperor wanted fighters he got some of the Igors to turn goblins into orcs" to be used as weapons in a Great War, "encouraged" by whips and beatings.

 In games 

Orcs based on The Lord of the Rings have become a fixture of fantasy fiction and role-playing games. In the fantasy tabletop role-playing game Dungeons & Dragons, orcs were among the earliest creatures introduced in the game, and were largely based upon those described by Tolkien. The D&D orcs are a tribal race of hostile and bestial humanoids with muscular frames, large canine teeth and snouts rather than human-like noses. The orc appears in the first edition Monster Manual (1977), where it is described as a fiercely competitive bully, a tribal creature often living underground. The mythology and attitudes of the orcs are described in detail in Dragon #62 (June 1982), in Roger E. Moore's article, "The Half-Orc Point of View", and the orc is further detailed in Paizo Publishing's 2008 book Classic Monsters Revisited.

Games Workshop's Warhammer universe features cunning and brutal Orks in a fantasy setting, who are driven not so much by a need to do evil as to obtain fulfilment through the act of war. In the Warhammer 40,000, a series of science-fiction games, they are a green-skinned alien species, called 'Orks'. Orcs are an important race in Warcraft, a high fantasy franchise created by Blizzard Entertainment. Several orc characters from the Warcraft universe are playable heroes in the crossover multiplayer game Heroes of the Storm. In the Elder Scrolls series, many orcs or Orsimer are skilled blacksmiths.
In Hasbro's Heroscape products, orcs come from the pre-historic planet Grut. They are blue-skinned, with prominent tusks or horns. Several orc champions ride prehistoric animals (including a Tyrannosaurus rex, a Velociraptor and sabre-tooth tigers, known as Swogs). The Skylander Voodood from the first game in the series, Spyro's Adventure, is an orc. The 1993 Wizards of the Coast collectible card game Magic: The Gathering involves numerous orc cards.

 See also 

 Haradrim – the dark-skinned "Southrons" who fought for Sauron alongside the orcs
 Troll (Middle-earth) –  large humanoids of great strength and poor intellect, also used by Sauron

 Notes 

References

 Primary This list identifies each item's location in Tolkien's writings.''

Secondary

Sources 
 
   
 
 
  
 
 ;

External links 

 9 milestones in orcs history. Wired magazine article
 RPG.NET Article about Orcs
 Orc Roleplaying Community website

Fantasy creatures
Fantasy tropes
Fictional humanoids
Fictional monsters
Fictional warrior races

Fictional elves
Fictional ogres
Fictional goblins
Middle-earth monsters